Dr Issam Nassar, is a Palestinian historian of photography in Palestine and the Middle East. He is professor of History at Illinois State University and a research fellow at the Institute for Palestine Studies. He taught at the University of California at Berkeley in 2006; Bradley University in 2003–2006 and al-Quds University in 1998–2003.

Nassar is the co-editor of Jerusalem Quarterly and author of a number of books and articles, among them Laqatat Mughayirah (Different Snapshots: The History of Early Local Photography in Palestine).

References

External links
 Illinois State University Professor, Issam Nassar "discusses" Israeli-Palestinian conflict, Scholars for Peace in the Middle East
 Jerusalem Quarterly official website

Year of birth missing (living people)
Living people
University of California, Berkeley faculty
Historians of the Middle East
Newspaper editors
Illinois State University faculty
Birzeit University alumni
University of Cincinnati alumni
Historians of photography
20th-century Palestinian historians
21st-century Palestinian historians